Bhumij is an Austroasiatic language belonging to the Munda subfamily, related to Ho, Mundari, and Santali, primarily spoken by Bhumij peoples in the Indian states Jharkhand, Odisha and West Bengal. As per the 2011 census, only 27,506 people out of 9,11,349 Bhumij people spoke Bhumij as their mother tongue, as most Bhumijas have shifted to one of the regional dominant languages. Thus the language is considered an extremely endangered language.

History 
Bhumij speakers have traditionally lived throughout the Kherwarian area in the modern states of Jharkhand, Orissa and West Bengal. While spoken by very few Bhumij people today, it was much more widespread historically. Those who lived east in Dhalbhum mostly shifted to the Bengali language and lost their local tongue, while those who lived around the Chota Nagpur Plateau held on to their language. Speakers have gradually dropped since the 1940s.

Bhumij was mainly an oral language until the development of the Ol Onal script by the Ol Guru Mahendra Nath Sardar between 1981-1992.

Bhumij has been described as related to Mundari and as a Munda language, so its ISO 639-3 code is [unr/unx].
Despite being linguistically and ethnically distinct from other Munda languages, Bhumij does not get its own ISO 639-3 code. Bhumij tribal people have protested for greater recognition and government funding for Bhumij-language education and public broadcasting resources.

Geographic distribution 
The highest concentrations of Bhumij language speakers are in East Singhbhum and Seraikela Kharsawan districts of Jharkhand, the Jangal mahals region of West Bengal (Jhargram, Bankura and Purulia districts) and Mayurbhanj district of Odisha.

Official status
In January 2019, Bhumij was accorded the status of second language in the state of Jharkhand.

States like Odisha, West Bengal and Bihar have a large number of Bhumij people, yet the Bhumij language has not been given the status of a state language in these states so far.

Writing system

Bhumij language is written in Ol Onal script, invented between 1981 and 1992 by Mahendra Nath Sardar. However, some speakers use the Bengali script, the Odia alphabet, or Devanagari to write the language.

See also 
 Languages of India
 Ol Onal script
 Bhumij

References

Further reading 
 

 
Munda languages
Bhumij
Languages of Jharkhand
Languages of Odisha
Languages of West Bengal
Languages attested from the 19th century